The marker-and-cell method is commonly used in computer graphics to discretize functions for fluid and other simulations. It was developed by Francis Harlow and his collaborators at the Los Alamos National Laboratory.

See also 
Immersed boundary method
Stokesian dynamics
Volume of fluid method
Level-set method

References

External links
Fluid flow for the rest of us, an explanation of fluid simulation (including the MAC grid)

Computational fluid dynamics